Litchfield Township may refer to the following places in the United States:

 Litchfield Township, Hillsdale County, Michigan
 Litchfield Township, Meeker County, Minnesota
 Litchfield Township, Medina County, Ohio
 Litchfield Township, Bradford County, Pennsylvania

See also 
 Litchfield (disambiguation)
 North Litchfield Township, Montgomery County, Illinois
 South Litchfield Township, Montgomery County, Illinois

Township name disambiguation pages